Oleg Rabota (born June 12, 1990) is a Kazakh swimmer, who specialized in middle-distance freestyle and backstroke events. He represented his nation Kazakhstan at the 2008 Summer Olympics, and has won a silver medal in the 200 m freestyle at the 2007 Asian Indoor Games in Macau, China. Rabota also served as a member of the Southern Illinois Salukis swimming and diving team under head coach Rick Walker, while pursuing his sports management studies at Southern Illinois University in Carbondale, Illinois.

Rabota competed for the Kazakh squad in two swimming events at the 2008 Summer Olympics in Beijing. He posted a time of 2:03.75 to set himself up as the fourth seed headed into the 200 m backstroke final of the Olympic test event in Beijing, and then snatched the 400 m freestyle title with a 3:56.98 at the Kazakhstan Open Championships three months later in Almaty; both of these marks dipped beneath the FINA B-cut. In the 400 m freestyle, Rabota fought off with Argentina's Juan Martín Pereyra for the fourth spot throughout the race, but relegated to fifth and thirty-sixth overall to round out the opening heat in 4:02.16. Four days later, in the 200 m backstroke, Rabota raced to second on the same heat by 0.78 of a second behind leader Brett Fraser of the Cayman Islands in 2:01.95, but his thirty-third place time in the prelims would not be enough to put him through to the semifinals.

References

External links
Profile – Kazakhstan Swimming Federation
Player Bio – Southern Illinois Salukis
NBC Olympics Profile

1990 births
Living people
Kazakhstani male backstroke swimmers
Olympic swimmers of Kazakhstan
Swimmers at the 2008 Summer Olympics
Swimmers at the 2006 Asian Games
Swimmers at the 2010 Asian Games
Kazakhstani male freestyle swimmers
Sportspeople from Almaty
Southern Illinois Salukis men's swimmers
Asian Games competitors for Kazakhstan
21st-century Kazakhstani people